

Barbados
Head Coach:

Canada 
Head Coach:  Sean Fleming

Costa Rica

Head Coach:

Cuba 

Head Coach:

Guatemala 

Head Coach:

Haiti 

Head Coach:

Honduras 

Head Coach:  José Valladares

Jamaica 

Head coach: Wendell Downswell

Mexico 
Head Coach:  Raúl Gutiérrez

Panama 

Head Coach:

Trinidad and Tobago 

Coach: Shawn Cooper

United States 

Head Coach:  Richie Williams

References

CONCACAF U-17 Championship squads
squads